Hypenodes anatolica is a species of moth in the family Erebidae. It was described by Leo Schwingenschuss in 1938. It is found in Bulgaria, Greece, North Macedonia and Turkey.

References

Moths described in 1938
Hypenodinae
Moths of Europe
Moths of Asia